Vladimir Petrović (born 4 February 1972) is a Croatian football coach and a retired striker. He is the manager of Austrian club ASC Rapid Kapfenberg.

Playing career
Petrović played for a number of teams in Croatia, France, Israel, China, Austria and Slovenia.

References

External links
 
 
Vladimir Petrović at Nogometni magazin 

1972 births
Living people
People from Teslić
Association football forwards
Croatian footballers
NK Marsonia players
HNK Segesta players
GNK Dinamo Zagreb players
Toulouse FC players
Beitar Jerusalem F.C. players
Qingdao Hainiu F.C. (1990) players
NK Zagreb players
NK Međimurje players
Zhejiang Professional F.C. players
Kapfenberger SV players
NK Croatia Sesvete players
FC Koper players
NK Sesvete players
Croatian Football League players
Ligue 1 players
Ligue 2 players
Israeli Premier League players
2. Liga (Austria) players
First Football League (Croatia) players
Slovenian PrvaLiga players
Croatian expatriate footballers
Expatriate footballers in France
Croatian expatriate sportspeople in France
Expatriate footballers in Israel
Croatian expatriate sportspeople in Israel
Expatriate footballers in China
Croatian expatriate sportspeople in China
Expatriate footballers in Austria
Croatian expatriate sportspeople in Austria
Expatriate footballers in Slovenia
Croatian expatriate sportspeople in Slovenia
Croatian football managers
Kapfenberger SV managers
Croatian expatriate football managers
Expatriate football managers in Austria